Ben Ash, professionally known as Two Inch Punch, is an English record producer, musician, remixer and songwriter. He has written and produced records with Jessie Ware, Sam Smith, Years & Years, Rag'n'Bone Man, Tory Lanez, Ty Dolla $ign, Damon Albarn, and Brian Eno.

Ash also collaborates with American producer Benny Blanco as the production outfit BenZel. They have featured with Sia, Wiz Khalifa, Juicy J, Cashmere Cat and Ryn Weaver.

Career
In 2012 Ash put out his first record "Love You Up" online under the alias Two Inch Punch. It was quickly downloaded and played by Diplo, DJ Oneman, Zane Lowe, Rinse FM DJs and other tastemakers, all via word of mouth. Nick Grimshaw made it his record of the week on BBC Radio 1, while the B-Side "Luv Luv" was being championed by MistaJam.  In 2012, the white label became big on the underground, selling out 200 records on the first day.

Ash then signed to PMR Records / Island Records and released his debut EP The Love You Up EP and The Slow Jams EP before going on to write for artists and building his sound and name as a producer / songwriter.

In 2015, Ash was nominated for two awards at the 57th Grammy Awards (Album of the Year and Best Pop Vocal Album) for his writing and producing contributions to Sam Smith's debut album In The Lonely Hour, winning the award for Best Pop Vocal Album. Following the success of his work with Sam Smith, Ash would then go on to have a production role on Rag'n'Bone Man's debut album Human.

Discography

Bold type denotes singles.

Remixes & edits

References

Living people
English record producers
English songwriters
English house musicians
English pop musicians
People from Brentford
Year of birth missing (living people)